Moissan is a lunar impact crater that is located on the far side of the Moon, within the west rim of the large crater Mendeleev, and due south of the similar-sized Bergman.

The crater name was adopted by the IAU in 1976, and refers to French chemist and Nobel laureate Henri Moissan.

References

External links
Moissan at The Moon Wiki
 LTO-66D2 Bergman — L&PI topographic map

Impact craters on the Moon